Benjamin Mimar (born 26 November 2000) is a Canadian pair skater. With his skating partner, Brooke McIntosh, he is the 2022 NHK Trophy bronze medallist and 2023 Canadian national silver medallist.
McIntosh/Mimar are also the 2022 World Junior bronze medallists and the 2022 Canadian junior champions.

Personal life 
Mimar was born on 26 November 2000 in Laval, Quebec, Canada. He has a younger sister, Frédérique, who is also a skater.

Career

Early years 
Mimar began learning how to skate in 2003. Skating with Marjolaine Ouimet, he placed fifth in novice pairs at the 2016 Canadian Championships.

He later competed in junior pairs with Chloe Panetta, coached by Richard Gauthier, Eric Radford, Ian Connoly, Sylvie Fullum, and Marlene Picard in Montreal. The team appeared twice on the Junior Grand Prix circuit, placing ninth at the 2018 JGP Canada and eighth at the 2019 JGP Croatia. At the Canadian Junior Figure Skating Championships, they finished fourth in 2019 and fifth in 2020.

Panetta/Mimar ended their partnership sometime between late January 2020 and 18 February 2020, when Mimar began skating with McIntosh. McIntosh/Mimar competed twice domestically during the 2020–21 season.

2021–22 season: Junior World bronze 
McIntosh/Mimar broke the Canadian junior pairs record to win their first junior national title as a team at the 2022 Canadian Championships in January. Shortly after that, they competed at their first junior international assignment, the 2022 Bavarian Open in Oberstdorf, Germany, where they won the title and earned their ISU technical minimums to compete at the 2022 World Junior Championships in April.

The World Junior Championships were originally scheduled to be held in Sofia in the traditional early March period. However, due to the pandemic, they were moved. Due to Vladimir Putin's invasion of Ukraine, the ISU banned all Russian athletes from competing, which had a significant impact on a pairs field dominated by Russia in recent years. McIntosh/Mimar placed fourth in the short program but climbed to third in the free skate to finish third overall. They took the bronze medal behind Georgian team Safina/Berulava and Australian team Golubeva/Giotopoulos Moore. McIntosh later said of their mindset going into the free program, "we focused on what we had to do for the free skate. We knew we were prepared, and we just had to go and show that. Even through the uncertainty of this season, we kept training and kept motivated."

2022–23 season 
With the Russian ban continuing into the new season, McIntosh/Mimar made their senior international debut in a very open pairs field. In their Challenger series debut at the 2022 CS Finlandia Trophy, they won the bronze medal. Mimar noted the event as a "new experience" and assessed that "our free wasn't the best we could do, after a good short, but we are still happy with third place."

McIntosh and Mimar were invited to make their Grand Prix debut at the 2022 Skate Canada International. They finished fourth in their first Grand Prix appearance, setting new personal bests in the free skate and total score. At their second assignment, the 2022 NHK Trophy in Sapporo, they placed third in the short program despite a minor throw error and set a new personal best in that segment. McIntosh said it was a "lot of fun skating in front of the Japanese crowd." They were third in the free skate as well, despite McIntosh falling on a throw triple loop and seeming to hurt her shoulder. The team won the bronze medal, their first on the Grand Prix, with Mimar saying he was "very proud of my partner that she fought until then end despite a fall." McIntosh subsequently said her arm had been checked by a doctor and was fine.

Shortly after the end of the Grand Prix, McIntosh/Mimar were the silver medallists at the 2022–23 Skate Canada Challenge after a rough free skate dropped them behind the new team Pereira/Michaud. They went on to win the silver medal at the 2023 Canadian Championships. Mimar said that it was the first time he had felt "really confident on the ice" with their free skate. Despite their silver medal, they were not one of the three teams selected to compete at the 2023 Four Continents Championships, though they were named to make their World Championship debut.

Programs

With McIntosh

With Panetta

Competitive highlights 
GP: Grand Prix; CS: Challenger Series; JGP: Junior Grand Prix

With McIntosh

With Panetta

With Ouimet

Men's Singles

References

External links 
 
 

2000 births
Living people
Canadian male pair skaters
Sportspeople from Laval, Quebec
World Junior Figure Skating Championships medalists